Aliabad-e Gowd Ginestan (also Romanized as ‘Alīābād-e Gowd Gīnestān) is a village in Sabzdasht Rural District, in the Central District of Bafq County, Yazd Province, Iran. At the 2006 census, its population was 11, in 6 families.

References 

Populated places in Bafq County